Besim Kuka is the current candidate for Dajt municipality for Democratic Party of Albania in the local elections of 2011. He was chosen in 2002 as leader of Dajt.

Shooting incident
On April 1, 2011 Kuka was shot four times with a shotgun, but was not injured.

References

Living people
Democratic Party of Albania politicians
Members of the Parliament of Albania
Politicians from Tirana
Year of birth missing (living people)